The Raiders is a 1916 American silent drama film directed by Charles Swickard and starring H.B. Warner, Dorothy Dalton and Robert McKim.

Cast
 H.B. Warner as Scott Wells 
 Dorothy Dalton as Dorothy Haldeman
 Henry Belmar as David Haldeman
 Robert McKim as Jerrold Burnes
 George Elwell as Jimmy Callaghan
 J. Barney Sherry as Dr. Hartman

References

Bibliography
 Robert B. Connelly. The Silents: Silent Feature Films, 1910-36, Volume 40, Issue 2. December Press, 1998.

External links
 

1916 films
1916 drama films
1910s English-language films
American silent feature films
Silent American drama films
American black-and-white films
Films directed by Charles Swickard
Triangle Film Corporation films
1910s American films